Ilya Vladimirovich Makiyenko (born 23 January 1971) is a Russian professional football coach and a former player. He is the assistant manager of FC Chita.

External links
 

1971 births
Living people
People from Komsomolsk-on-Amur
Russian footballers
FC Luch Vladivostok players
Russian football managers
FC SKA-Khabarovsk players
Association football midfielders
FC Smena Komsomolsk-na-Amure players
FC Chita players
Sportspeople from Khabarovsk Krai